John Joseph Dunn (September 1, 1870 – August 31, 1933) was an American prelate of the Catholic Church. He served as an auxiliary bishop of the Archdiocese of New York from 1921 until his death in 1933.

Biography
John Dunn was born in New York City to John and Mary (née Cassidy) Dunn. He received his early education at the parochial school of St. Gabriel's Church on the East Side of Manhattan. He then attended St. Francis Xavier's College before entering St. Charles College in Ellicott City, Maryland, from where he graduated in 1890. He returned to New York and there completed his theological studies at St. Joseph's Provincial Seminary in Troy.

Dunn was ordained to the priesthood on May 30, 1896. He was then appointed a curate at St. John the Evangelist's Church, where he remained until 1921. In 1904, he was named diocesan director of the Society for the Propagation of the Faith, a position which he retained until his death. During his first 17 years as director, he raised over $2 million for Catholic foreign missions. He also served as chancellor of the Archdiocese of New York from 1914 to 1921. In 1916, he vigorously defended Catholic institutions in New York during their investigation by the Charities Department under Mayor John Purroy Mitchel; he was charged with crimes against the city, including libel, obstruction of justice, and perjury based on information obtained through wiretaps, but were later dropped.

On August 19, 1921, Dunn was appointed Auxiliary Bishop of New York and Titular Bishop of Camuliana by Pope Benedict XV. He received his episcopal consecration on the following October 28 from Archbishop Patrick Hayes, with Bishops Joseph Conroy and John O'Connor serving as co-consecrators, at St. Patrick's Cathedral. He selected as his episcopal motto: Adoro Te Devote (Latin: "Devotedly I Adore Thee").

In addition to his duties as director of the Society for the Propagation of the Faith, Dunn was named pastor of the Church of the Annunciation in Manhattanville. He became treasurer of the archdiocese in 1922, and was vice-president of Catholic Charities. He also served as chaplain of the New York chapter of the Knights of Columbus; spiritual director of the archdiocesan Union of the Holy Name Societes; and Grand Prior of the American chapter of the Knights of the Holy Sepulchre, an order in which he held the rank of Knight Grand Cross. He was ecclesiastical superior of the Sisters of St. Dominic, and was instrumental in the development of Mount St. Mary College in Newburgh.

Dunn died from a heart attack at St. Vincent's Hospital, at age 63. He is buried at the cemetery of the Sisters of St. Dominic.

References

1870 births
1933 deaths
Clergy from New York City
20th-century Roman Catholic bishops in the United States
Knights of the Holy Sepulchre